Sam Clarke (born 6 March 1996) is an Australian motorcycle racer.

Career statistics

Grand Prix motorcycle racing

By season

Races by year
(key)

References

External links

Profile on MotoGP.com

Australian motorcycle racers
1996 births
Living people
Moto3 World Championship riders